Sir Gregory Page-Turner, 3rd Baronet (16 February 1748 – 4 January 1805) was a wealthy landowner and politician in late 18th century England, serving as Member of Parliament (MP) for Thirsk for 21 years.

Gregory Turner ("Page" was added later) was the eldest son of Sir Edward Turner, 2nd Baronet of Ambrosden near Bicester in Oxfordshire. Gregory succeeded him to become the third Turner baronet on 31 October 1766.

Pompeo Batoni painted Sir Gregory's portrait in about 1768. In 1771, Sir Gregory sold the manor of Wendlebury, Oxfordshire, which his father had bought in 1764, to his father's steward John Pardoe.

In 1775 he inherited substantial estates in northwest Kent (today part of southeast London) from his great-uncle Sir Gregory Page, and added "Page" to his surname. That year he served as High Sheriff of Oxfordshire and then as MP for Thirsk from April 1784 until his death in 1805.

Sir Edward Turner, 2nd Baronet had a country house, Ambrosden House, built by the architect Sanderson Miller in the 1740s. Sir Gregory never lived at Ambrosden, thought the house too big and in 1767 sought to demolish part of it to make it smaller. This proved impractical so in 1768 he had the entire house demolished.

He died at the age of 56 and was buried in Bicester. He had married Frances, the daughter of Joseph Howell. Their son Gregory Osborne Page-Turner (1785–1843) succeeded him to become the fourth baronet.

References

Sources

|-

1748 births
1805 deaths
Turner baronets
Members of the Parliament of Great Britain for English constituencies
Members of the Parliament of the United Kingdom for English constituencies
UK MPs 1801–1802
UK MPs 1802–1806
British MPs 1784–1790
British MPs 1790–1796
British MPs 1796–1800
High Sheriffs of Oxfordshire